Darzikola-ye Akhundi may refer to:
 Darzikola-ye Akhund-e Baba
 Darzikola-ye Akhundi-ye Bala
 Darzikola-ye Akhundi-ye Pain